Zálesí  (until 1948 Valdek; is a village and administrative part of Javorník in the Olomouc Region of the Czech Republic. The population was 20 according to 2001 census. It is located in the Golden Mountains.

History
In the past, the village administered the no-longer existing settlement Waldoro.

Travná had 456 inhabitants in 1930 and the same number declared residency in 1939.

References

Further reading
 Gernot, Ludwig; Wolf, Kurt: Jauernig und das Jauerniger Ländchen. Das 2. Heimatbuch des ehemaligen Gerichtsbezirkes Jauernig - 1995.
 Hosák, Ladislav: Historický místopis Moravy a Slezska v letech 1848-1960 - 1967, Profil Ostrava.
 Kuča, Karel: Města a městečka v Čechách, na Moravě a ve Slezsku II. díl - 1997, Libri Praha.
 Pachl, Hans: Jauernig und das Jauerniger Ländchen. Ein Heimatbuch des ehemaligen Gerichtsbezirks Jauernig - 1983.

External links

 Website of microregion Javornicko
 Web-page about the Rychlebské Hory region
 Czeska kopalnia uranu Javornik - Zalesie - a study of the abandoned uranium mine in Zálesí (in Polish).
 Dobývání uranu - Zálesí u Javorníka Part 1 und Part 2 - a slideshow with old and modern photos and maps of the uranium mine in Zálesí (in Czech).

Neighbourhoods in the Czech Republic
Populated places in Jeseník District
Geological type localities